The Violin sonata in G minor (HWV 368) is a work for violin and basso continuo that was originally thought to have been composed by George Frideric Handel. Modern scholars however believe it doubtful that the work was composed by Handel, and have labelled it as "spurious". The work is also referred to as Opus 1 No. 10, and was first published in 1732 by Walsh. Other catalogues of Handel's music have referred to the work as HG ; and HHA .

Both the Walsh edition and the Chrysander edition indicate that the work is for violin, and published it as Sonata X. In both editions, the tempo of movement four is unmarked (but appears to be an allegro, or similar).

Movements
The work consists of four movements:

(Movements do not contain repeat markings unless indicated. The number of bars is taken from the Chrysander edition, and is the raw number in the manuscript—not including repeat markings.)

See also
List of solo sonatas by George Frideric Handel
XV Handel solo sonatas (publication by Chrysander)
Handel solo sonatas (publication by Walsh)

References

Violin sonatas by George Frideric Handel
1732 compositions
Compositions in G minor